Thomas Girardi (born June 3, 1939) is a former attorney and co-founder of the now-defunct Girardi & Keese, a downtown Los Angeles law firm. He was disbarred in 2022 after accusations of defrauding clients.

Career 
Girardi graduated from Loyola High School (Los Angeles) in 1957. He received his undergraduate degree from Loyola Marymount University in 1961, his J.D. degree from Loyola Law School in 1964, and an LL.M. from New York University in 1965. In 1970, Girardi became the first attorney in the state of California to win a $1 million-plus award for a medical malpractice case. Girardi has handled major cases against the former Lockheed Corp (now the Lockheed Martin Corp.), Pacific Gas & Electric Co, Los Angeles County Metropolitan Transportation Authority, and Hollywood's seven major movie studios.

In a notable case against Pacific Gas & Electric, the utility company agreed to pay $460 million to 650 residents of the desert community of Hinkley, California. The residents blamed incidents of cancer and other diseases on contaminated water leaked from a gas pumping station. This case was the inspiration for the film Erin Brockovich (2000) starring Julia Roberts. "That particular case revolutionized people's thinking about all the toxic things they are exposed to," he told Attorney at Law magazine. Girardi also served as an adviser on the film. In 2003, he received the honor of being inducted into the Trial Lawyer Hall of Fame by the California State Bar. According to his website, he is a Member of the Board of Directors and former President of the prestigious International Academy of Trial Lawyers, an invitation-only worldwide organization limited to 500 trial lawyers. Girardi was also the first trial lawyer to be appointed to the California Judicial Council, the policymaking body of the state courts.

Girardi was known for his work in Democratic party politics, donating millions of dollars to campaigns, playing a role in fundraising events, and giving advice to governors regarding judicial appointments.

Legal issues and license suspension

In 2010, Girardi was among a group of lawyers who attempted to enforce in U.S. courts a $489 million default judgment entered by a court in Nicaragua, allegedly against Dole Food and Shell Chemicals based on the effects of the pesticide DBCP upon exposed workers. The U.S. courts found that Girardi and others had submitted a translation of the pertinent Nicaraguan documents that was flawed in crucial respects. Girardi and others were formally reprimanded, and their law firm was fined for violating their duty of candor to the courts.

2018 Indonesia airplane crash case
In December 2020, a federal judge in Chicago froze Girardi's assets, citing that he had "misappropriated at least $2 million in client funds that were due to the families of those killed" by the  Boeing 737 MAX Lion Air Flight 610 crash in Indonesia.

No one from the Girardi Keese law firm, including Girardi, appeared at the first bankruptcy hearing, in January 2021, for two Chapter 7 involuntary bankruptcy petitions filed in December 2020.

In March 2021 the Los Angeles Times reported that Girardi had been sued more than 100 times. Multiple complaints had been filed against him with the California State Bar. Nevertheless, his Bar license had remained pristine due to alleged improper relationships between Girardi and Bar officials, as well as Girardi not having malpractice insurance. Many of the Bar complaints involved alleged financial malfeasance, including allegations of theft by two dozen women who won $17 million in a lawsuit claiming that hormone replacement therapy caused their cancer along with the alleged misappropriation of millions of dollars in a burn victim lawsuit.

On March 9, 2021, the State Bar of California changed Girardi's status to "not eligible to practice law in [California]".

On June 1, 2022, a court ordered Girardi disbarred and to pay $2,300,000 in restitution.  

On July 1, 2022, the State Bar of California changed Girardi's status to "Disbarred".

Personal life 
In August 1964, Girardi married his first wife Karen Weitzul. She filed for divorce in October 1983. Girardi then married Kathy Risner in September 1993, and Kathy filed for divorce in January 1998. Kathy passed away in May 2018. 

In January 2000, 60-year-old Girardi married his third wife, 28-year-old singer and actress Erika Jayne, who later became known as a star of the reality-television series The Real Housewives of Beverly Hills. He has appeared in several episodes of The Real Housewives of Beverly Hills alongside his wife. In November 2020, Erika Girardi announced the couple had separated and that she had filed for divorce.

In February 2021, Girardi was placed in a conservatorship due to short-term memory loss, and in March 2021 he was diagnosed with Alzheimer's disease. Girardi was placed in a memory care facility in August 2021.

References

External links
 at Girardi & Keese website

Disbarred American lawyers
Loyola Marymount University alumni
Loyola Law School alumni
Living people
1939 births